Pyrops karenius, also known as the Red-nosed Lanternfly, is a species of planthopper belonging to a group commonly referred to as lantern-flies. This species is found in Burma, Thailand and the Karen Hills of India. The head, its protrusion and the thorax are reddish brown. The cephalic process is slightly recurved and its tip is flattened.

References

karenius
Insects of Myanmar
Insects of Thailand
Insects of India
Insects described in 1891